Pott Shrigley is a civil parish in Cheshire East, England. It contains 19 buildings that are recorded in the National Heritage List for England as designated listed buildings.  Of these, one is listed at Grade I, the highest grade, one is listed at Grade II*, the middle grade, and the others are at Grade II.  Apart from the village of Pott Shrigley, the parish is almost entirely rural.  Most of the listed buildings are farmhouses and farm buildings, houses and cottages.  Parts of the Macclesfield Canal run through the parish, and the listed buildings associated with this are a bridge, an aqueduct, and fence posts.  The other listed structures are a church and churchyard cross, a school, a hotel and leisure centre, a telephone kiosk, and a parish boundary stone.

Key

Buildings

See also

Listed buildings in Poynton with Worth
Listed buildings in Lyme Handley
Listed buildings in Rainow
Listed buildings in Bollington
Listed buildings in Adlington, Cheshire

References
Citations

Sources

Listed buildings in the Borough of Cheshire East
Lists of listed buildings in Cheshire